Todos Santos Airstrip  is a private-use dirt airstrip located 4 miles east of Todos Santos, Municipality of La Paz, Baja California Sur, Mexico, a town located near the Pacific Ocean coast. Permission must be given before landing (the runway is closed with obstacles).

External links
Baja Bush Pilots Forum about Todos Santos Airstrip.
Runway photo.

Airports in Baja California Sur
La Paz Municipality (Baja California Sur)